Dietrich Burger (born 14 August 1935) is a German painter and graphic artist.

Life 
Born in Bad Frankenhausen, Burger studied at the Hochschule für Grafik und Buchkunst Leipzig under Bernhard Heisig from 1953 to 1958. From 1964, he taught there, from 1984 to 2000 as professor of painting and graphic arts.

Reception 
"In Dietrich Burger's paintings and graphic art, one encounters an unmistakably high proportion of identity between life and work. Thus, not only do things he has lived through and experienced take place in a more or less encoded form in his paintings, but the pictorial landscapes also deal with existential questions for him. The painter's gaze, always directed towards reality, and a seismographically inward-looking registration interweave in the painterly and graphic structure."

Work 
Burger stands for a constructivist variant of Saxon painting, with a high proportion of identity between life and work. His stations in life often determine individual forms of expression within his works. His early works are particularly influenced by classical French modernism, especially Corot, Watteau, Chardin, Picasso and Matisse.

Honours 
 1988: Art Prize of the German Democratic Republic.

Individual exhibitions 
 1978: Dietrich Burger: Malerei und Grafik, Lindenau-Museum.
 1995: Malerei/Grafik/Zeichnungen, Galerie Kleindienst, Leipzig.
 2000: Dietrich Burger: Malerei, Zeichnung, Druckgraphik, Lindenau-Museum.
 2005: Neue Bilder, Galerie Kleindienst, Leipzig.
 2008: Dietrich Burger: Gestern und Heute, Galerie am Domhof, Zwickau.
 2010: bb, Galerie Kleindienst, Leipzig.

Participation in exhibitions 
 1961: 6. Bezirkskunstausstellung, Leipzig
 2007: Seit Leipzig, Kunsthalle Wittenhagen
 2011: Hochdruck an der HGB Leipzig, Hochschule für Grafik und Buchkunst Leipzig.

Works in museums and public collections 
 Altenburg (Thüringen), Lindenau-Museum (many works, among others Spaziergänger; Tafelbild, Tempera, 1988?)
 Gera, Kunstsammlung Gera,  (among others I'm Garten / Die Kinder des Künstlers; Graphitzeichnung, 1976)

Further reading 
 Dietrich Burger (with the catalogue raisonné of the prints). Lindenau Museum, Altenburg, 1978
 Dietrich Burger. Painting, Drawing, Graphic Print.'' (Works from 1961 to 1999, with list of exhibitions, bio and bibliography.), Lindenau-Museum, Altenburg, 2000

References

External links 
 
 Kurzvita auf Kunstauktionen Schmidt Dresden

20th-century German painters
20th-century German male artists
Graphic artists
1935 births
Living people
People from Bad Frankenhausen